Democratic Front, also known as FREDEMO, was a center-right economically liberal and social conservative political alliance in Peru founded in 1988 by Liberty Movement, Popular Action and Christian People's Party. FREDEMO contested the 1989 municipal elections and the 1990 presidential elections (with famous author Mario Vargas Llosa as its candidate).

Electoral history

Presidential elections

Elections to the Congress of the Republic

Elections to the Senate 

Defunct political party alliances in Peru
Political parties established in 1988
Political parties disestablished in 1990
Mario Vargas Llosa